The Ballad of Black Tom is a 2016 fantasy-horror novella by Victor LaValle, revisiting H. P. Lovecraft's story "The Horror at Red Hook" from the viewpoint of a black man.

Synopsis
In 1924 Harlem, Tommy Tester is a small-time hustler whose regular guise as a street musician brings him in contact with reclusive millionaire Robert Suydam, who wants him to participate in a nefarious scheme involving the Great Old Ones. Among the tools that Tester uses to thwart the scheme is the Supreme Alphabet of the Five-Percent Nation.

Reception

"The Ballad of Black Tom" won the 2016 Shirley Jackson Award for best novella, and was a finalist for the 2016 Bram Stoker Award for Best Long Fiction, the Nebula Award for Best Novella of 2016, the 2017 British Fantasy Award for best novella, the 2017 Theodore Sturgeon Award, the 2017 Hugo Award for Best Novella, and the 2017 World Fantasy Award—Long Fiction.

Slate called it "riveting", "clever", and "compelling", and noted LaValle's comparison of "cosmic indifference" to targeted racist malice and brutality. Vice described it as "tightly written, beautifully creepy, and politically resonant", and emphasized that despite its nature as a literary "rebuttal", it is still "a thrilling Lovecraftian tale of mystery, monsters, and madness".

Nina Allan commended LaValle for "making (...) 'The Horror at Red Hook' (into) an actual story (...) featuring real characters with real motivations – a claim that can not safely be made for the original tale", but observed that — when compared to the vivid "lunacy" of Lovecraft's writing — LaValle's prose is "grounded and sound in both mind and body" and ultimately "pedestrian". Conversely, the Philadelphia Inquirer preferred LaValle's "sharp and direct sentences" to Lovecraft's "spongy prose".

Adaptations
In 2017, AMC announced that it was planning a TV adaptation of The Ballad of Black Tom, with LaValle as co-executive producer.

References

External links
'The Ballad Of Black Tom' Offers A Tribute To And Critique Of Lovecraft: Victor LaValle interviewed on National Public Radio's Fresh Air
Excerpt from "The Ballad of Black Tom", at Tor.com
GUEST INTERVIEW Ardi Alspach Chats with Victor LaValle About Lovecraft, Racism and THE BALLAD OF BLACK TOM, at SF Signal
The Big Idea: Victor LaValle, essay by LaValle on the process of writing the story, at Whatever

2016 American novels
Cthulhu Mythos short stories
Novels based on works by H. P. Lovecraft
American novellas
Cthulhu Mythos novels
Fiction set in 1924
Novels set in the 1920s
2016 science fiction novels
Tor Books books